The  is a limited express train service in Japan operated by Shikoku Railway Company (JR Shikoku) and Tosa Kuroshio Railway which runs from  to  with a few services continuing to  and . Trains are formed of 2-car 2700 series DMUs, and sometimes are coupled with Nanpū services between Tadotsu or Utazu and Kochi.

The Shimanto service was introduced on 10 April 1988.

Route
The main stations served by this service are as follows.

 -  -  -  -

Rolling stock
 2700 series 2-car tilting DMUs (2019– )

Past rolling stock

 KiHa 181 series DMUs (1988–1993)
 KiHa 185 series DMUs (1988–1993)
 2000/N2000 series tilting DMUs (1989–2021)

References

Named passenger trains of Japan
Shikoku Railway Company
Railway services introduced in 1988